Pierre van der Linden (born 19 February 1946) is a Dutch drummer, songwriter and member of the band,  Focus.

Biography
Van der Linden was influenced by his childhood hero Buddy Rich. He finds inspiration in French philosophers and classical composers of the twentieth century. For drumming, he is influenced by Tony Williams and Elvin Jones. Van der Linden practises his drumming technique each day, at least one hour on his practise pad. He avoids modern tuning and prefers to use open tuning, closer to a jazz than a rock drummer, and adopts a mix of matched grip and traditional grip. Away from music, van der Linden enjoys painting and writing poetry.

In the 1990s he joined the free jazz group Advance Warning and played on four albums: Cut the Crap, Regroovable, Hot House, and HiFi Apartment. He also recorded in a trio with organist Herbert Noord and tenor saxophonist Rinus Groeneveld, and rated the album Dare to Be Different as one that he was particularly proud to play on.

Discography
Swung Vol. 1 & 2 (2014)
Drum Poetry (2017)

References 

1946 births
Living people
Dutch jazz drummers
Male drummers
Jazz fusion musicians
Progressive rock drummers
Musicians from Amsterdam
Male jazz musicians
Focus (band) members